UgMicroSatdb (UniGene Microsatellites database) is a database of microsatellites present in uniGene.

See also
 Microsatellites
 Unigene

References

External links
 http://veenuash.info/web1/index.htm

Biological databases
Genetics databases
Repetitive DNA sequences